Cloudy Creek is a stream in Pushmataha County, Oklahoma. It is a tributary of the Little River.

Cloudy Creek was so named on account of the muddy (or "cloudy") character of its water.

See also
List of rivers of Oklahoma

References

Rivers of Pushmataha County, Oklahoma
Rivers of Oklahoma